Jeremy Johnson may refer to:

Jeremy Johnson (baseball) (born 1982), minor league baseball pitcher
Jeremy Johnson (American football) (born 1994), American football quarterback
Jeremy Johnson (entrepreneur), an African technology entrepreneur
Jeremy Johnson (Phineas and Ferb), a character from Phineas and Ferb
Jeremy Robert Johnson, American writer, Bram Stoker Award for Best First Novel

See also
Jerry Johnson (disambiguation)